Mohammad Asrarul Haque (commonly known as Asrarul Haq Qasmi ; 15 February 1942 – 7 December 2018) was an Indian Muslim scholar and politician, who served as the eighth general secretary of the Jamiat Ulama-e-Hind. He was a member of the Indian Parliament, and represented Kishanganj seat. He was also the state president of Jamiat Ulema-e-Hind.

Biography 
Haq was born on 15 February 1942. He was an alumnus of the Darul Uloom Deoband.

Haq won from the Kishanganj seat in the 2009 Indian general election by contesting on an Indian National Congress ticket. In the 2014 general election, he contested against Bharatiya Janata Party candidate Dilip Jaiswal. He retained his seat in the election, polling the highest number of votes in the state.

Haq helped found the center of the Aligarh Muslim University in Kishanganj. Two Circles, in a report, blamed him for not taking steps for the improvement of government colleges in the area, saying that "the condition of government colleges was disappointing." He was a member of the All India Muslim Personal Law Board and the president of All India Milli Council. Following Syed Ahmad Hashmi, Haq served as the general secretary of the Jamiat Ulama-e-Hind from 1981 to 1990.

Haq addressed a gathering of students and teachers at Darul Uloom Suffah on 6 December 2018. He was pronounced dead at around 3:30 AM, 7 December 2018. The cause of death was a heart attack.

Views 
Haq felt that Indians will "strongly resist" any attempt of the government to drop the Article 370 which bestows a special status on the state of Jammu and Kashmir. Citing the fact that the Bharatiya Janata Party had secured 31% of the votes in the 2014 general election, Haq claimed the party had no right to modify the Constitution. He criticized the BJP that the party had failed to abide by the promises they made about employment. He also criticized the idea of cashless economy.

Haq said that there is an "international Zionist conspiracy" which asserts that Islam promotes terrorism. He criticized the Boko Haram and said the organization was a part of the conspiracy.

Personal life 
Haq married Salma Khatoon on 16 May 1965. She died on 9 July 2012. He had two sons and three daughters.

References 

|-

1942 births
2018 deaths
India MPs 2009–2014
Lok Sabha members from Bihar
India MPs 2014–2019
People from Kishanganj district
Indian National Congress politicians
Deobandis